Jose Luis Correa (born January 24, 1958) is an American businessman and politician serving as the U.S. representative for  since 2017. His district is based in Orange County and includes the communities of Anaheim and Santa Ana, as well as parts of Orange. A member of the Democratic Party, Correa represented the 34th district in the California State Senate from 2006 to 2014.

Before his career in politics, Correa was an investment banker, a real estate broker, and a college instructor.

Early life and education

Correa's paternal grandfather came to the United States from Mexico to work for the Southern Pacific Transportation Company in the 1910s. His grandfather settled down in the U.S. and started a family. During the Great Depression, he returned to Mexico with his American-born children. Years later, Correa's father got married and moved from Mexico to California.

Correa was born in East Los Angeles. His mother was killed in a car accident in Mexico when he was two. This resulted in Correa and his father moving to Zacatecas, Mexico. Five years later, he and his father moved to the Penguin City neighborhood in Anaheim, California. Correa's family unit comprised his father, Correa's sister, and an aunt he called "mom." Correa's father worked at a cardboard factory. His aunt cleaned hotel rooms making $1.50 an hour. The family moved regularly due to the cost of rent.

Correa started second grade speaking only Spanish. He struggled to learn English initially, but became fluent over time. He graduated from Anaheim High School and earned a Bachelor of Arts in economics from California State University, Fullerton and a Juris Doctor and Master of Business Administration from the University of California, Los Angeles.

California legislature

State Assembly 
Correa's political career began in 1996 when he ran for the California State Assembly as the Democratic nominee in the 69th Assembly district. He lost to Republican incumbent Jim Morrissey by just 93 votes. In a 1998 rematch, Correa was elected to the Assembly, defeating Morrissey 54% to 43%.

While a member of the Assembly, Correa served on several committees and chaired the Committee on Business and Professions, the Public Employees, Retirement and Social Security Committee; the Select Committee on Mobile Homes; and the Select Committee on MCAS El Toro Reuse.

Correa was reelected to the Assembly twice but was forced from office by California's term limits law, which restricted members from serving more than three two-year terms.

In 2004, Correa was elected to the Orange County Board of Supervisors, becoming the first Democrat to serve on the board since 1987. He represented the first district, which includes the cities of Garden Grove, Santa Ana, and Westminster as well as unincorporated areas of the county including Midway City.

State Senate

In January 2006, Correa entered the race for the Democratic Party nomination for the California State Senate 34th district, a seat vacated by termed-out State Senator Joe Dunn.

After defeating Assemblyman Tom Umberg in the June primary, Correa defeated Republican Assemblywoman Lynn Daucher in the November general election by a margin of 1,392 votes. He was sworn into the State Senate on December 4, 2006.

In 2010, Correa was reelected over Anaheim City Councilwoman Lucille Kring.

In a January 27, 2015, special election, Correa ran for the Orange County Board of Supervisors, but was defeated by former Garden Grove City Councilman Andrew Do by a margin of 43 votes (0.1%).

U.S. House of Representatives

Elections

2016
Correa ran for the United States Congress for the 46th district, which was being vacated by 10-term incumbent Loretta Sanchez, who was running for United States Senate. He came in first in the June 7 primary with 43.7% of the vote, and won the general election against Democrat Bao Nguyen, who earned 14.6% of the vote in the top-two primary, with 69.9% of the vote.

Tenure
Correa is a member of the Blue Dog Coalition.

2021 storming of the U.S. Capitol

Correa was participating in the certification of the 2021 United States Electoral College vote count when supporters of outgoing President Donald Trump stormed the United States Capitol. He was in the House Chamber when rioters tried to break through the chamber doors. He hid in the gallery with other Congress members, holding a gas mask in case of tear gas. He said the rioters "have been misled by this crazy, tyrant president who keeps saying it was stolen from him when it wasn’t."

A group of Trump supporters harassed Correa at Dulles International Airport as he was leaving Washington to return to Orange County after certifying the electoral votes. People called him names and one man told him, "Your lie has been exposed. This not a democracy. It is a republic." After one woman told him to "go to work in China", Correa responded, "Maybe Russia is better. Comrade! Comrade!" Minutes later, airport police dispersed the crowd. Correa expressed concern that the airport police did not question or detain the harassers. He supported efforts to impeach Trump and called on Vice President Mike Pence to invoke the Twenty-fifth Amendment to the United States Constitution.

Committee assignments
 Committee on Homeland Security
 Subcommittee on Border and Maritime Security
 Subcommittee on Oversight and Management Efficiency (Ranking Member)
 Committee on Veterans' Affairs
 Subcommittee on Economic Opportunity
 Subcommittee on Health

Caucus memberships
 Blue Dog Coalition
 New Democrat Coalition
 House Baltic Caucus
 Congressional Hispanic Caucus
 Congressional Asian Pacific American Caucus
Blue Collar Caucus
Problem Solvers Caucus (Former)

Political positions

Abortion
Correa has a 100% rating from NARAL Pro-Choice America and an F rating from the Susan B. Anthony List for his abortion-relating voting history. He opposed the overturning of Roe v. Wade, saying: "By preventing women from having access to health care, we are putting their lives in jeopardy. The decision should be left to woman, her doctor, and her god."

Big Tech
In 2022, Correa was one of 16 Democrats to vote against the Merger Filing Fee Modernization Act of 2022, an antitrust package that would crack down on corporations for anti-competitive behavior.

Personal life

In 1990, Correa married his wife, Esther. They lived in Anaheim with Correa's father until Correa was in his 40s. Correa lives in Santa Ana, California. He and his wife have four children.

See also

 List of Hispanic and Latino Americans in the United States Congress

References

External links

 Congressman Lou Correa official U.S. House website
 Lou Correa for Congress campaign website
 
 

|-

|-

|-

|-

|-

1958 births
20th-century American politicians
21st-century American politicians
American investment bankers
American real estate brokers
Democratic Party California state senators
California State University, Fullerton alumni
Educators from California
Hispanic and Latino American members of the United States Congress
Hispanic and Latino American state legislators in California
Living people
Democratic Party members of the California State Assembly
Democratic Party members of the United States House of Representatives from California
Mexican-American people in California politics
Orange County Supervisors
People from Anaheim, California
People from East Los Angeles, California
Politicians from Zacatecas
UCLA Anderson School of Management alumni
UCLA School of Law alumni